Enkhe-Tala is a rural locality (a selo) in Kyakhtinsky District, Republic of Buryatia, Russia. The population was 381 as of 2010. There are 3 streets.

Geography 
Enkhe-Tala is located 69 km southeast of Kyakhta (the district's administrative centre) by road. Kholoy is the nearest rural locality.

References 

Rural localities in Kyakhtinsky District